This is a timeline of the history of the Syro-Malabar Catholic Church in India.

Ancient Era 

AD 52 - Arrival of Saint Thomas the Apostle in Muziris (near Kodungalloor) in Thrissur district of Kerala; established churches at Kodungalloor, Palayoor, Paravur (Kottakkavu), Kokkamangalam, Chayal (Nilackel), Niranam and Kollam

3 July 72 Martyrdom of Saint Thomas the Apostle at Chinnamala, Mylapore, Chennai (Tamil Nadu)
105 church at Kuravilangad
250–325 Bishops Mar David and Mar Yohannan ("Metropolitan of India")
325 Mar Yohannan, the Persian presiding over the churches in all Persia and Great India, attended the First Council of Nicaea and signed in the decrees of the council
340–360 by the Thazhekad Sasanam the Nazranies granted special rights and privileges
829 Church of the East Patriarch, Timotheus I sent Bishops Mar Sapore (Kollam) and Mar Proth (Kodungalloor)

849 Ayyanadikal Kurakoni (Iyenadikal Thiruvadikal), King of Venad, granted special privileges to Christians of Kollam
892 Tharisapalli plates
1291 arrival of John of Montecorvino, a member of Societas Peregrinantium Pro Christo,  in Kollam
1292 arrival of Venetian traveller Marco Polo in India; he later testified about Christian presence
1301 Mar Jacob (Mar Yaqob of India), 1301 AD) was one of the legendary metropolitan of the Church of Malabar of St Thomas Christians
1323 arrival of French Dominican friar Jordanus Catalani de Severac in Kollam (Quilon)
1324 Jordanus Catalani de Severac wrote Mirabilia Descripta, a rare work on plants, animals and the people of India and of other countries in Asia
9 August 1329 Pope John XXII (in captivity in Avignon) erected Quilon as the first Diocese in the whole of Indies as suffragan to the Archdiocese of Sultany in Persia through the decree Romanus Pontifix
21 August 1329 Pope John XXII by the bull Venerabili Fratri Jordano, appointed the French Dominican friar Jordanus Catalani de Severac as the first Bishop of Quilon
23 March 1346 arrival of John De Marignolli, Legate to China, in Quilon
1490 Two bishops, Mar Yohannan and Mar Thoma, served in India, sent there by the Patriarch of the Church of the East.

Portuguese Era 
20 May 1498 arrival of Vasco da Gama
1504 Bishop Mar Yacob (Kodungalloor)
6 June 1542 preaching by Francis Xavier
1555 Bishop Mar Joseph took charge
4 February 1557 Pope Paul IV established, by his Bull "Pro Excellento Praeeminentia", Diocese of Cochin
1564 Mar Abraham appointed Archbishop of Angamaly (Pope Pius IV)
29 August 1567 establishment of Archdiocese of Angamaly as Metropolitan see
1597 death of Mar Abraham, the last Syrian archbishop; burial at the Church of St. Hormice, Angamaly
20 June 26 June 1599 Synod of Diamper
5 November 1599 Francis Ros nominated first Latin Bishop of Syrians
4 August 1600 extension of the Rule of Padroado on Syrians
7 December 1603 Angamaly Synod
3 December 1609 seat of the Archdiocese of Angamaly moved to Kodungalloor

Era of Divisions 
22 December 1610 Archbishop Menezes of Goa restricted the jurisdiction of the Metropolitan of St. Thomas Christians from the north of Malabar to the south
December 1647 Archbishop Garcia appointed Fr. Jerome Furtado as Vicar General in place of the traditional Archdeacon
1652 Mar Ahatalla met deacons Chenkayil Itty of Chengannur and Kizhakkedath Kurian of Kuravilangad at Mylapore and sent message to the Archdeacon
3 January 1653 Archdeacon and others with 25,000 soldiers went to Cochin Port to receive Mar Ahatalla; but the Portuguese did not permit Mar Ahattalla to meet the people; rumour spreads that Ahatalla was murdered by the Portuguese
3 January 1653 Archdeacon Parambil Thoma and the elders take the oath Coonan Cross Oath at Mattancherry that they will no longer be under the Portuguese Jesuits
22 May 1653 Episcopal ordination of Thomas the Archdeacon at Alangad by 12 priests of St. Thomas Christians
1659 death of Archbishop Garcia SJ
3 December 1659 Vicariate Apostolic of Malabar (Verapoly) erected by Pope Alexander VII
15 December 1659 Episcopal Ordination of Italian Sebastiani OCD
17 December 1659 Bishop Sebastiani OCD took charge as Administrator of Malabar
24 December 1659 Bishop Sebastiani given power to ordain a Bishop in Malabar by Pope Alexander VII through the Apostolic Letter Pro Commissa Nobis
7 January 1662 The conquest of Portuguese territories in Malabar and especially of Cochin by the Dutch and all the Catholic Missionaries including Bishop Sebastiani OCD were expelled from the territories occupied by the Dutch
31 January 1663 Alexander Palliveettil (Parambil Chandy, Alexander de Campo) appointed the first Syrian Vicar Apostolic of Malabar
1665–1671 Spread of Jacobite faith by Mar Gregorios of Jerusalem in Malabar
1 February 1663 Palliveetil mar Chandy consecrated as Metropolitan and gate of all India.
2 January 1687 Death of Bishop Alexander Palliveettil (Parambil Chandy Malpan, Bishop Alexander de Campo)
29 June 1704 John Ribeiro S. J. appointed Archbishop of Kodungalloor (Padroado)
13 March 1709 Suppression of Vicariate Apostolic of Malabar and Vicariate Apostolic of Verapoly erected by Pope Clement XI
1773 February 8 Martyrdom of Fr. Jacob (Ikako) Puthenpurackal 
16 July 1782 Mar Joseph Kariyatty appointed Archbishop of Kodungalloor by Padroado
16 December 1782 Rome approves Mar Joseph Kariyatty as Archbishop of Kodungalloor
17 February 1783 Episcopal ordination of Mar Joseph Kariyatty at Lisbon, Porgugal
10 September 1786 Death of Archbishop Kariyatty in Goa; Paremmakkal Thoma Kathanar appointed Gubernador (Administrator) of the Archdiocese of Kodungalloor
1 February 1787 Angamaly Padiyola

The Dark Era of Invasions

 December 1790 - Invasion of Mysore ruler Tipu Sultan on Kingdom of Cochin. Ancient Syrian churches at Palayur, Arthat, Ollur, Parappukkara, Velayanad (Mukundapuram), Ambazhakad, Thazhekad, Angamaly, Akaparamb etc. were destroyed by the Mysore army. The Syrian seminary and nasrani church headquarters at Angamaly were devastated.
The headquarters of the church moved first to Alengad and then to Vadayar in Travancore.
Many priests and laymen were martyred for faith and hundreds of Nasranis migrated to Travancore to protect their faith.
20 March 1799 Death of Paremmakkal Thoma Kathanar
10 February 1805 Birth of Kuriakose Elias Chavara at Kainakary, Alappuzha
1818 Arrival of the CMS missionaries
11 May 1831 Foundation of the first indigenous religious congregation (CMI) at Mannanam by Frs. Thomas Palackal, Thomas Porookara and Kuriakose Elias Chavara
1833 Establishment of the Seminary at Mannanam
24 April 1838 The final Latin invasion on the Indian Syrian church - the Metropolitan See of Kodungallur (Angamaly for Syrians) and the See of Cochin were suppressed and territory was added to Vicariate Apostolic of Verapoly by the Brief "Multa Praeclara" of Pope Gregory XVI
1861- The arrival of chaldean bishop Thomas mar Rocos 
8 June 1861 Fr. Kuriakos Elias Chavara appointed Vicar General for Syrians
13 February 1866 Foundation of the first indigenous religious congregation for women (CMC) at Koonammavu
13 August 1866 Establishment of Seminary at Puthenpally
1866 Purchase of land in the name of Parayil Varky Tharakan at Mangalappuzha near Aluva
3 January 1871 Death of Kuriakose Elias Chavara
1 August 1874 Chaldean bishop Mar Elia Melus arrived in Kerala
25 October 1874 Mar Melus excommunicated by Rome. Origin of Suryis of Thrisur (Assyrian Church of the East)
26 April 1876 Birth of Sr. Mariam Thressia at Puthenchira, Thrisur
12 October 1877 Episcopal ordination of Bishop Marcellinus OCD
17 October 1877 Birth of Sr. Euphrasia (Rose) at Kattur, in the parish Edathuruthy, Thrisur
15 November 1877 Bishop Marcellinus OCD made ruler of the Syrians
19 March 1878 Bishop Marcellinus OCD commenced his reign
23 June 1886 See of Cochin (for Latin Catholics) restored by Pope Leo XIII
1 September 1886 Establishment of the Latin Hierarchy in India by Pope Leo XIII by the decree Humanae Salutis Auctor; Vicariate Apostolic of Verapoly elevated to Archdiocese of Verapoly

Era of self-governance 
20 May 1887 two independent Vicariates of Kottayam (present Changanaseri1) and Thrisur2 for Syrians; Charles Lavigne and Adolf Medlycott were made Vicar Apostolic respectively (Quod Jampridem, Pope Leo XIII)
14 December 1888 foundation of Franciscan Clarist Congregation (FCC) at Changanaseri
16 September 1890 seat of Kottayam Vicariate moved to Changanaseri
1 April 1891 birth of Augustine Thevarparampil (Kunjachan) at Ramapuram, Kottayam
24 June 1892 foundation of Sisters of the Visitation of the Blessed Virgin Mary (SVM) at Kaipuzha, Kottayam
28 July 1896 Vicariate of Ernakulam3 created, with territories from both Vicariates of Changanaseri and Thrissur and Mar Aloysius Pazheparambil, Mar Mathew Makkil, and Mar John Menachery were made the bishops respectively (Quae Rei Sacrae, Pope Leo XIII).
8 December 1908 foundation of  Sisters of Adoration of the Blessed Sacrament (SABS) at Champakulam, Changanaseri
19 August 1910  Birth of Sr. Alphonsa Muttathupadth FCC at Kudamaloor, Kottayam.
1 January 1911 foundation of Sacred Heart Congregation for Women (Kerala) (SH) at Palai
29 August 1911 establishment of Kottayam4 Vicariate for the Knanaya (Suddists) Community of the Syrians
14 May 1914 foundation of the Congregation of Holy Family (CHF) at Puthenchira, Thrisur by Mariam Thressia
29 January 1921 foundation of Eparchial Society of the Oblates of the Sacred Heart (OSH)

Metropolitan Archbishop, Title restoration
21 December 1923 establishment of the Syro-Malabar Hierarchy with Ernakulam as the Metropolitan See and Mar Augustine Kandathil as the first Head and Archbishop of the Church (Romani Pontifices, Pope Pius XI)
16 November 1924 Mar Augustine Kandathil installed as Archbishop
19 March 1927 foundation of the Sisters of the Destitute (SD) at Chunungumvely, Ernakulam by Varghese Payyappilly Palakkappilly
19 July 1927 foundation of the Vincentian Congregation (VC)
3 July 1928 foundation of Sisters of St Joseph Congregation (SJC) at Kottayam
5 October 1929 death of Mar Varghese Payyappilly Palakkappilly
19 March 1931 foundation of the Congregation of Saint Thérèse of Lisieux (CST) by Mar Augustine Kandathil as a religious brothers congregation, the first such in India
1 June 1932 establishment of Mangalapuzha Seminary
7 May 1933 foundation of the Missionary Congregation for the Blessed Sacrament (MCBS)
1 January 1944 foundation of Congregation of Sisters of Charity (CSC) at Chollannoor, Thrisur
31 October 1944 foundation of Medical Sisters of St Joseph (MSJ) at Kothamangalam
27 December 1945 Fr. Thomas Panatt (Fr. Basilius CST) founds the priestly wing of the Congregation of Saint Thérèse of Lisieux (CST) to better realise its aims
28 July 1946  death of Sr. Alphonsa  Muttathupadath FCC at Bharanaganam
19 March 1948 foundation of Congregation of the Sisters of Nazareth (CSN) at Edakkunnu, Ernakulam
20 April 1948 foundation of Congregation of the Sisters of St. Martha (CSM) at Ponnookara, Thrisur
2 April 1949 foundation of Assisi Sisters of Mary Immaculate (ASMI) at Cherthala, Alappuzha by Mgr. Joseph K. W. Thomas
25 July 1950 eparchy of Palai5
29 August 1952 death of Sr. Euphrasia CMC
1 December 1953 official visitation of Cardinal Tisserant of the Oriental Churches in India
31 December 1953 Eparchy of Thalaseri6
29 January 1954  Birth of Sr. Rani Maria FCC at  Pulluvazhy, Ernakulam.
10 January 1956 death of Archbishop Mar Augustine Kandathil
26 July 1956 Changanaseri made Archiparchy

10 January 1957 Eparchy of Kothamangalam7
1 June 1957 establishment of Dharmaram College, a major seminary by the CMI in Bangalore
1 January 1958 Fr. Placid Podipara made Rector of Malabar College in Rome
25 January 1961 foundation of Congregation of Samaritan Sisters (CSS) at Thrisur
19 December 1961 The Portuguese surrendered to Indian army. Portuguese colonies including Goa were liberated and annexed to Indian Union.
31 March 1962 eparchy of Chanda,8 Maharashtra (CMI)
3 July 1962 establishment of St. Thomas Apostolic Seminary, Vadavathoor, Kottayam
16 May 1968 foundation of Malabar Missionary Brothers (MMB)
16 July 1968 foundation of the Missionary Society of St Thomas the Apostle (MST)
29 July 1968 eparchy of Sagar,9 Madhya Pradesh (CMI)
29 July 1968 eparchy of Satna,10 Madhya Pradesh (VC)
29 July 1968 eparchy of Ujjain,11 Madhya Pradesh (MST)
3 July 1969 foundation of Missionary Congregation of the Daughters of St. Thomas (DST) at Aruvithura, Kottayam
23 March 1972 eparchy of Bijnor,12 Uttarakhand (CMI)
23 March 1972 eparchy of Jagdalpur,13 Chattisgargh (CMI)
1 March 1973 eparchy of Mananthavady14
16 October 1973 death of Fr. Augustine Thevarparampil (Kunjachan)
20 March 1974 St Marys Basilica, Ernakulam- first basilica in Syro Malabar church was designated.
20 June 1974 eparchy of Palakkad15
25 February 1977 eparchy of Rajkot16 (CMI)
26 February 1977 eparchy of Kanjirappally17
19 May 1977 foundation of Society of Kristu Dasis (SKD) at Mananthavady by Bishop Jacob Thoomkuzhy
22 June 1978 eparchy of Irinjalakkuda18
26 August 1978 Cardinal Joseph Parekkattil attended Conclave – first of its kind from Syro-Malabar Rite
8 September 1978 Mar Antony Padiyara appointed Apostolic Visitor of Non-resident Keralite Syro-Malabarians by Pope John Paul I
19 June 1984 eparchy of Gorakhpur,19 Uttar Pradesh (CST)
27 April 1985 death of Father Placid J Podipara
19 December 1985 approval of the Text of the Order of Syro-Malabar Qurbana by the Sacred Congregation for Oriental Churches
8 February 1986 inauguration of the Order of Syro-Malabar Qurbana by Pope John Paul II at Kottayam
8 February 1986 Beatification of Fr. Kuriakose Elias Chavara CMI and Sr. Alphonsa Muttathupadathu FCC at Kottayam by Pope John Paul II – first man and woman from India to the Altar
28 April 1986 eparchy of Thamaraseri20
30 April 1988 eparchy of Kalyan,21 Maharashtra
3 July 1989 establishment of the Renovated Syro-Malabar Qurbana by the Sacred Congregation for Oriental Churches
3 July 1989 foundation of Sisters of St. Thomas (SST) at Managanam, Kottayam
25 April 1992 Our Lady of Dolours Basilica, Thrissur designated.

A Major-Archiepiscopal church 
16 December 1992 establishment of Major Archiepiscopal see of Ernakulam-Angamaly
29 January 1993 Cardinal Antony Padiyara, the first Major Archbishop (Quae Majori Christifidelium, Pope John Paul II), and Mar Abraham Kattumana, made Pontifical Delegate
20 May 1993 Cardinal Padiyara takes charge. First Synod of the Church
25 February 1995  Sr. Rani Maria FCC martyred at Indore, Madhya Pradesh
18 May 1995 eparchies of Thrissur and Thalasseri made Archeparchies
18 December 1996 Cardinal Padiyara's resignation accepted. Archbishop Mar Varkey Vithayathil CSSR, Apostolic Administrator of Ernakulam–Angamaly
11 November 1996 Eparchy of Thuckalay,22 (Kanyakumari) Tamil Nadu
28 October 1997 foundation of Mar Thoma Sleeha Monastery (MTSM) at Nallathanni, Kottayam
3 February 1998 Major Archiepiscopal Headquarters at Mount St. Thomas, Kakkanad
9 November 1998 First Major Archiepiscopal Assembly
24 April 1999 Eparchy of Belthangady,23 (Mangaloru), Karnataka
23 July 1999 Eparchy of Adilabad,24 Telangana (CMI)
9 April 2000 Beatification of Sr. Mariam Thressia CHF in Vatican by Pope John Paul II
6 July 2001 Eparchy of St. Thomas of Chicago,25 United States
19 December 2002 Eparchy of Idukki26
9 May 2005 Eparchy of Kottayam made Archieparchy
30 April 2006 Beatification of Fr. Augustine Theavarparampil (Kunjachan) at Ramapuram, Palai by Major Archbishop Varkey Vithayathil
3 December 2006 Beatification of Sr. Euphrasia CMC at Ollur, Thrissur by Major Archbishop Cardinal Varkey Vithayathil
21 August 2007 Eparchy of Bhadravathi,27 Karnataka (MCBS)
22 July 2008 Christ University – the first University by the Catholic Church in India, established by the CMIs in Bangalore
12 October 2008 Canonization of Sr. Alphonsa (Anna) Muttathupadath FCC in Vatican by Pope Benedict XVI – the first woman Saint from India
6 November 2008 visit of Cardinal Leonardo Sandri, Prefect of the Congregation for the Oriental Churches; he visited many eparchies in Kerala and paid respects to St. Alphonsa at her tomb at Bharananganam
24 June 2009 Pope Benedict XVI declares the St. George Churuch at Angamaly a minor Basilica
6 August 2009 Major Archbishop promulgates the Order of Celebrations on Nativity of Our Lord, Ash Day, Osana Sunday, Thursday of Pesha, Friday of Passion, Great Saturday and Great Sunday of Resurrection
14 August 2009 Fr. John Vadakkel CMI, appointed bishop of the Eparchy of Bijnor
23 August 2009 Union Government of India issued coins in honour of St. Alphonsa
6 September 2009 Mar Varghese Payyappilly Palakkappilly declared Servant of God
18 January 2010  Eparchies of Mandya,28 (Mysoru), Karnataka and Ramanathapuram,29 (Coimbatore), Tamil Nadu
24 May 2011 Mar George Alencherry elected as the third Major Archbishop
6 March 2012 Eparchy of Faridabad (Delhi) erected for Indian states of Haryana, Punjab, Himachal Pradesh, Jammu & Kashmir, parts of Uttar Pradesh and national capital territory of Delhi.
11 January 2014 Eparchy at Melbourne, Australia erected.
23 November 2014 Canonisation of Blessed Chavara and Blessed Euphrasia
6 August 2015 Apostolic exarchate at Mississauga, Canada.
26 August 2015 Extension of the territory of eparchy of Mandya to Bangalore and certain other parts of Karnataka.
28 July 2016 Erection of eparchy of Great Britain for England, Scotland and Wales.
27 November 2016 Kalloorkad St Marys church, Champakulam was designated as basilica.
10 October 2017 2 New eparchies were erected.
Eparchy of Hosur (Mylapore) erected for parts of Tamil Nadu and Pondicherry.
Eparchy of Shamshabad (Hyderabad) erected for Indian states of Goa, Andhra Pradesh, Odisha, Jharkhand, Bihar, West Bengal, Rajasthan, North Eastern states, parts of 8 other states and 4 union territories of India (including 2 island groups).
 Extension of the territories of two eparchies: Ramanathapuram (Coimbatore) and Thuckalay (Kanyakumari).
 4 November 2017 Beatification of first woman martyr of Syro Malabar church, Sr. Rani Maria in Indore (Madhya Pradesh)
Eparchy of Mississauga, Canada
Canonization of Saint Mariam Thresia
 1 April 2021 Bishop Mar Joseph Kallarangatt of Palai renewed Holy Leaven (Malka) for liturgical use - first time a bishop renewed Holy Leaven after the Synod of Diamper had banned its use.

See also

 Christianity in India
 Timeline of Indian history
 Timeline of the Catholic Church

References

Sources

External links
Syro-Malabar Church Official website
Archdiocese of Tellicherry
The website for Synod of Diamper

Syro-Malabar Catholic Church
Syro-Malabar Catholic Church, Timeline of the